This was the first edition of the tournament.

Ashlyn Krueger and Robin Montgomery won the title after Harriet Dart and Giuliana Olmos withdrew before the final.

Seeds

Draw

Draw

References
Main Draw

Arcadia Women's Pro Open - Doubles